Richard Daley may refer to:
Richard J. Daley (1902–1976), mayor of Chicago (1955–1976), father of Richard M. Daley
Richard M. Daley (born 1942), mayor of Chicago (1989–2011), son of Richard J. Daley

See also
Richard Daly (1758–1813), Irish actor and theatrical manager
Richard J. Daly, American business executive
Richard Dalley, American figure skater
Dick Daley (1910–1984), Australian rugby league footballer